Encounter is an album by Trio 3, a jazz group consisting of saxophonist Oliver Lake, bassist Reggie Workman and drummer Andrew Cyrille. It was recorded in 1999 and released on Lake's own Passin' Thru label.

Reception

In his review for AllMusic, Alain Drouot states "This recording is one of the best testimonies to Cyrille's art as well as a major statement by three great and inspired musicians at the peak of their powers."

Gary Giddins wrote: "Oliver Lake, Andrew Cyrille, and Reggie Workman unite with a kind of loft-era thrift, and everything works—the energy level high, the affect sparkling yet controlled, and never a tossed-off moment. Lake's timbre is a saw with inch-long teeth and thoroughly fetching; I'd love to hear him commune with Lee Konitz."

Track listing
 "Crooked Blues" (Bobby Bradford) – 6:28
 "Leaving East of Java" (Steve Colson) – 13:38
 "Encounter" (John Carter) – 6:17
 "Reminds Me" (Oliver Lake) – 4:51
 "Ode to the Living Tree" (Andrew Cyrille) – 6:32
 "Suite Tristan" (Reggie Workman) – 14:17
 "Nicodemus" (Andrew Hill) – 6:04

Personnel
Oliver Lake –  alto saxophone, soprano saxophone, flute
Reggie Workman – bass
Andrew Cyrille – drums

References

2000 albums
Trio 3 (free jazz trio) albums